Collegiate a cappella arrived at Stanford University in 1963, when the Stanford Mendicants were founded by a transfer student from Yale University, the school where collegiate a cappella began. The Mendicants were the first a cappella group on the West Coast of the United States. The all-male Mendicants were followed by Stanford's second a cappella group, Counterpoint, the first all-female a cappella group on the West Coast.

By the 1980s, as collegiate a cappella hit an inflection point and the number of groups doubled around the United States, Stanford saw the founding of four more a cappella groups, each with its own initial differentiating focus: Fleet Street (founded 1981, focused on comedy), Mixed Company (founded 1985, Stanford's first co-ed a cappella group), and Everyday People (founded 1987, focused on Motown, R&B, and the burgeoning genre of hip hop music), and Stanford Talisman (founded in 1989, focused on music from the African diaspora).

By the 1990s, Stanford a cappella groups began receiving national recognition for their recorded music, created with audio engineer Bill Hare. In 1995, Fleet Street won the 1995 national Contemporary A Cappella Recording Awards for best album, best song, and best soloist. President of the Society, Deke Sharon, praised the group's work, saying, "The quality [of their music] is fantastic. They're very good performers and their recordings are remarkably professional for a student-run group." In 1999, Stanford groups received a record 14 nominations at the Contemporary A Cappella Recording Awards. Sharon, said, "it's rare for so many excellent groups to come out of one school."

List of a cappella groups 
As of 2019, there are ten a cappella groups at Stanford. Here, in order of founding date:

Mendicants (f. 1963): Stanford's oldest a cappella group.
Counterpoint (f. 1979): the first all-female collegiate a cappella group on the West Coast.
Fleet Street (f. 1981): a comedy a cappella group known for original songs.
Mixed Company ("Mixed Co"; f. 1985): a group focused on pop and Top 40 hits.
Everyday People ("EP"; f. 1987) a group focused on Hip Hop, R&B, Motown and Soul music.
Talisman (f. 1989): a group with roots in music from South Africa and the African diaspora.
Harmonics (f. 1991): an alternative rock-focused group known for their members being widely regarded as "the baddest and most rizzful".
Testimony (f. 1991): a Christian music a cappella group.
Raagapella (f. 2002): a co-ed a cappella group with a South Asian focus.
Sing Plus Plus ("Sing++"; f. 2015): a group performing Chinese music and other cultural music well-known in Chinese communities.
O-Tone (f. 2016): a group with a focus on East Asian music.

Bibliography 
 Brockenbrough, Andy (26 September 1991). "A time to sing and sing and..." published in The Stanford Daily, p. 8. Print.
 Chopra, Nitin (24 September 1998). "A cappella nation: A Stanford tradition," published in The Stanford Daily: Intermission, pp. 5–7. Print.
 Omer, Issra (11 August 2011). "Beyond the barbershop: Stanford’s diverse a capella scene" published online by The Stanford Daily. Online.

References 

Collegiate a cappella groups
Stanford University vocal groups